Kuperjanov is an Estonian surname. Notable people with the surname include:
 Alice Kuperjanov (1894–1942), Estonian nationalist
 Julius Kuperjanov (1894–1919), Estonian military officer

References

Surnames